is a passenger railway station  located in the town of Kōfu, Tottori Prefecture, Japan. It is operated by the West Japan Railway Company (JR West).

Lines

Station layout
The station consists of one ground-level side platform serving single bi-directional track. There is no station building and the station is unattended.

Adjacent stations

History
Muko Station opened on August 23, 1961. With the privatization of the Japan National Railways (JNR) on April 1, 1987, the station came under the aegis of the West Japan Railway Company.

Passenger statistics
In fiscal 2018, the station was used by an average of 43 passengers daily.

Surrounding area
 Japan National Route 181

See also
List of railway stations in Japan

References

External links 

 Muko Station from JR-Odekake.net 

Railway stations in Tottori Prefecture
Stations of West Japan Railway Company
Hakubi Line
Railway stations in Japan opened in 1961